Ålo is a village in Kristiansand municipality in Agder county, Norway.

References

Geography of Kristiansand
Villages in Agder